Wykoff Run Natural Area is a state forest natural area in the Elk State Forest in Gibson Township, Cameron County in the U.S. state of Pennsylvania. The  natural area is in the center of Quehanna Wild Area. It was once home to two jet engine testing cells, when the area was a research facility for Curtiss-Wright Corporation from 1955 to 1960.

References

Protected areas of Cameron County, Pennsylvania